The 1929 Green Bay Packers season was their 11th season overall and their ninth season in the National Football League. The team finished with an undefeated 12–0–1 record under player/coach Curly Lambeau, earning them a first-place finish and the Packers' first National Football League Championship. A victory celebration of 20,000 fans greeted them upon their return to Green Bay from their final game in Chicago. In an exhibition game after the season, on December 15, the Packers lost to the Memphis Tigers, who then claimed a pro football championship.

Before the start of the season, the Packers signed three future Hall of Famers: Johnny "Blood" McNally, Cal Hubbard, and Mike Michalske, who along with Lambeau led the Packers to the top of the league. Green Bay's current throwback uniform is based on the ones worn in 1929 in respect of the season that the Packers won their first championship. There is a debate among sports historians on whether or not the 1929 season was a perfect season for the franchise. 

Some historians consider the 1929 season a perfect season since the Packers didn't lose a single game, joining the 1948 Cleveland Browns and the 1972 Miami Dolphins as one of the few undefeated NFL teams. Others argue that it was that one November 28th game with the Frankford Yellow Jackets, in which both teams failed to score any points, ultimately preventing the Packers from a obtaining perfect season. 
Regardless of that historic debate, it can't be denied that it was a very successful year for the team.

Schedule

Standings

References

Sportsencyclopedia.com

Green Bay Packers seasons
National Football League championship seasons
Green Bay Packers
Green Bay Packers